Kazan-2 was a regional airport in Kazan, Tatarstan, Russia, in service from 1979 until the late 1980s. Passenger service was provided by Antonov An-2s and Let L-410 small aircraft and a few helicopters.

An old airfield for Kazan's major airport (situated outside city limits) was likely built during the World War II era. Although the airport is gone, the surrounding neighborhood still carries the name 'Old Airport' (tat. İske Aeroport, rus. Старый Аэропорт).

References
RussianAirFields.com

Defunct airports
Airports built in the Soviet Union
Airports in Tatarstan
History of Kazan